The 2011–12 season was Fulham's 114th professional season and their 11th consecutive season in the top flight of English football, the Premier League. They also competed in the FA Cup,  the League Cup, and the Europa League. Fulham finished the season in ninth place after their last league match against Tottenham Hotspur resulted in a 0–2 defeat on 13 May 2012.

Premier League

League table

Results summary

Results

FA Cup

Football League Cup

UEFA Europa League

Qualifying
Fulham entered at the First qualifying round, having qualified through the UEFA Fair Play League. The First and Second Qualifying Round draws took place at UEFA headquarters in Nyon, Switzerland, on 20 June 2011, while the Third Qualifying Round and Play-off draws were also held at UEFA headquarters in Nyon on 15 July 2011 and 5 August 2011 respectively.

Group stage

Statistics

Appearances & goals
Last updated 5 May 2012

|-
|}

Top scorers
Includes all competitive matches. The list is sorted by shirt number when total goals are equal.

Last updated on 5 May 2012

Disciplinary record

Includes all competitive matches.

Last updated 5 May 2012

Transfers

Players in

Players out

Loans out

References

External links
Fulham F.C. official website
Fulham club profile on UEFA

Fulham F.C.
Fulham F.C. seasons
Fulham